The Hôtel Potocki is a former residence of the Polish noble Potocki family in the 8th arrondissement of Paris. The architectural style is of a hotel particulier.

The palace was once the location of the fashionable salon of Countess Emanuela Potocka.

Today, the Chamber of Commerce and Industry of the Paris - Île-de-France Region has its seat there.

External links 

Buildings and structures in the 8th arrondissement of Paris
Potocki
Potocki family